Gastrodes grossipes, the pine cone bug, is a true bug found in most of Europe except in the far north. To the east, the distribution area extends over Asia minor and the Caucasus, and then across the Palearctic to Siberia. The food plant is Scots pine.

References

External links 
 British Bugs

Hemiptera of Europe
Lygaeidae
Insects described in 1773
Taxa named by Charles De Geer